The 1957 Texas Western Miners football team was an American football team that represented Texas Western College (now known as University of Texas at El Paso) as a member of the Border Conference during the 1957 NCAA University Division football season. In its first season under head coach Ben Collins, the team compiled a 6–3 record (3–2 against Border Conference opponents), finished third in the conference, and outscored all opponents by a total of 202 to 168.

Schedule

References

Texas Western
UTEP Miners football seasons
Texas Western Miners football